is a passenger railway station located in  Isogo-ku, Yokohama, Kanagawa Prefecture, Japan, operated by the private railway company Keikyū.

Lines
Byōbugaura Station is served by the Keikyū Main Line and is located 33.0 kilometers from the terminus of the line at Shinagawa  Station in Tokyo.

Station layout
The station consists of two elevated opposed side platforms with the station building underneath.

Platforms

History
Byōbugaura Station was opened on April 1, 1930 as a station on the Shōnan Electric Railway, which merged with the Keihin Electric Railway on November 1, 1941. A new station building was erected in 1964, and extensively remodeled in 1991.

Keikyū introduced station numbering to its stations on 21 October 2010; Byōbugaura Station was assigned station number KK45.

Passenger statistics
In fiscal 2019, the station was used by an average of 18,233 passengers daily. 

The passenger figures for previous years are as shown below.

Surrounding area
 Isogo Central Neurosurgery Hospital
 Byobugaura Hospital
 Shiomidai housing complex
 Koshinkai Shiomidai Hospital

See also
 List of railway stations in Japan

References

External links

 

Railway stations in Kanagawa Prefecture
Railway stations in Japan opened in 1930
Keikyū Main Line
Railway stations in Yokohama